Gerome Breen is a psychiatric geneticist who is Professor of Psychiatric Genetics in the MRC Social, Genetic and Developmental Psychiatry Centre at the Institute of Psychiatry, King’s College London. With Thalia C. Eley, he runs the Genetic Links to Anxiety and Depression (GLAD) study, and serves as the leader of the NIHR Mental Health BioResource.

References

External links
Faculty page

Living people
Psychiatric geneticists
Academics of King's College London
Year of birth missing (living people)